Dragon Ball Z Game Music is a series of soundtracks of various video games based on the popular anime series Dragon Ball Z for the Famicom, Super Famicom, PlayStation, and Saturn consoles. They were produced from 1993 to 1996. Most, with some exceptions, were distributed by Forte Music Entertainment, and were released in Japan only.

Gaiden 

 is the official licensed soundtrack of the video game of the same name for the Famicom system and later the Playdia's Shin Saiyan Zetsumetsu Keikaku Parts 1 and 2. It was released by Forte Music Entertainment on October 21, 1993.

It features music that was composed and arranged by Keiju Ishikawa. For the most part, the arrangement is composed of synthesizer keyboard-based work with added drum loops; however, there are a few tracks that contain guitar work. One feature on this album is that the tracks are listed in English instead of Japanese.

Track listing:
Main Theme of "Gaiden"
Search For Destron Gas
The Earth Field
Pacify A Storm
A Skirmish
Four Emperors
Grand Battle
Polluted Town
Planet Darkness
A One-Eyed Old Doctor
Ephemeral Requiem

Super Butoden 

 is the official licensed soundtrack of the video game of the same name. It was released by Columbia Records on March 27, 1993.

This album features arranged (reproduced in a higher quality of musical resources.) tracks that were performed by Hyper Monolith.

Track listing:
《オープニング》超武闘伝のテーマ《Ōpuningu》 Sūpā Butôden no Tēma/《Opening》 Theme of Super Butôden
《バトルステージ1》ピッコロのテーマ《Batoru Sutēji Wan》 Pikkoro no Tēma/《Battle Stage 1》 Theme of Piccolo
《バトルステージ2》ベジータのテーマ《Batoru Sutēji Tzu》 Bejīta no Tēma/《Battle Stage 2》 Theme of Vegeta
《バトルステージ3》フリーザのテーマ《Batoru Sutēji Surī》 Furīza no Tēma/《Battle Stage 3》 Theme of Freeza
《バトルステージ4》人造人間20号のテーマ《Batoru Sutēji Foru》Jinzōningen Jūnigō no Tēma/《Battle Stage 4》Theme of Artificial Human #20
《バトルステージ5》人造人間18号のテーマ《Batoru Sutēji Faivu》Jinzōningen Jūhachigō no Tēma/《Battle Stage 5》Theme of Artificial Human #18
コンティニューのテーマKontinyū no Tēma/Theme of Continue
《バトルステージ6》セルのテーマ《Batoru Sutēji Shikkusu》Seru no Tēma/《Battle Stage 6》Theme of Cell
《バトルステージ7》人造人間16号のテーマ《Batoru Sutēji Seban》Jinzôningen Jūrokugō no Tēma/《Battle Stage 7》Theme of Artificial Human #16
《バトルステージ8》セル完全体のテーマ《Batoru Sutēji Etto》Seru Kanzentai no Tēma/《Battle Stage 8》 Theme of Perfect Cell
ファイナル・バトルのテーマFainaru Batoru no Tēma/Theme of Final Battle
《エンディング》新たなる闘いへ《Endingu》Arata Naru Tatakai e/《Ending》Toward a New Battle
《???》超武闘伝:?のテーマ《???》Sūpā Butōden: ? no Tēma/《???》Theme of Super Butôden: ?

Super Butoden 2 

 is the official licensed soundtrack of the video game of the same name. It was released by Forte Music Entertainment on December 21, 1993.

This album features arranged tracks, two of which were performed by a live orchestra and the rest remixed reprises.

Track listing:
オーブニングŌpuningu/Opening
Suite:1 武闘伝モードSuite:Wan Butōden Mōdo/Suite:1 Butōden Mode
ベジータのテーマBejīta no Tēma/Theme of Vegeta
サンギャのテーマZangya no Tēma/Theme of Zangya
孫悟飯のテーマSon Gohan no Tēma/Theme of Son Gohan
ピッコロのテーマPikkoro no Tēma/Theme of Piccolo
セルのテーマSeru no Tēma/Theme of Cell
ボージャックのテーマBōjakku no Tēma/Theme of Bojack
トランクスのテーマTorankusu no Tēma/Theme of Trunks
Suite:2 ファイナルバトル~エンティングSuite:Tzū Fainaru Batoru~Endingu/Suite:2 Final Battle: Ending

Super Butoden 3 

 is the official licensed soundtrack of the video game of the same name. It was released by Forte Music Entertainment on October 21, 1994.

This album features arranged (reproduced in a higher quality of musical resources) remixes by Kenji Yamamoto, since a majority of the compositions also appeared in Super Butoden 2.

Track listing:
OVERTURE～迫る！！「天下一武道会」～OVERTURE~Semaru!! "Tenkaichi Budôkai"~/Overture: Drawing near!! The "Tenkaichi Budokai"
「オープニングテーマIII」～激動の「天下一武道会」開催！！～"Ōpuningu Tēma Surī"~Gekidô no "Tenkaichi Budôkai" Kaisai!!~/"Opening Theme III": The Chaotic "Tenkaichi Budôkai" Convenes!!
「孫悟天～トランクス」～少年の部、決勝戦～[Son Goten~Torankusu]~Shônen no Bu, Kesshôsen~/"Son Goten~Trunks": Category of Juveniles, Final Games
「新Ｚ戦士」～本戦始まる！！～[Shin Zetto Senshi]~Hon Sen Hajimaru!!~/"New Z Warrior": True Battle Begins!!
「魔人ブウ」Ｖａｒｉａｔｉｏｎ～悪の魔導師登場！！～[Majin Buu] Variation~Aku no Madôshi Tôjô!!~/"Majin Buu" Variation: Evil Magician Enters!!
「悟空」と「ベジータ」のメドレー～宿命の対決～[Gokū] to [Bejīta] no Medorē~Shukumei no Taiketsu~/ Medley of "Goku" and "Vegeta": Showdown of Fate
「魔人ブウ」～魔人の復活～[Majin Buu]~Majin no Fukkatsu~/"Majin Buu": Revival of Majin
「青年トランクス」のテーマ　Ｖａｒｉａｔｉｏｎ～未来から来た超戦士～[Seinen TORANKUSU] no TĒMA Variation~Mirai kara Kita Chô Senshi~/Theme of "Young Trunks" Variation: Super Warrior that came from the Future
「エンディングテーマIII」～「孫悟空」Ｖａｒｉａｔｉｏｎ～[Endingu Tēma Surī]~[Son Gokū] Variation~/"Ending Theme III": "Son Goku" Variation
ＦＩＮＡＬＥ～「凶戦士ベジータ」Ｐｏｗｅｒ　ｕｐ　ｖｅｒｓｉｏｎ～FINALE~[Kyô Senshi Bejīta] Power up version~/FINALE:"Evil Warrior Vegeta" Power up version

Super Gokuden 
  
 is the official soundtrack video game of the same name for the Super Famicom. It was released on April 21, 1995.

This feature arranged work composed by Kenji Yamamoto. A few tracks on this album were performed by orchestra. The soundtrack has been referred as ahead of its time.

Track listing:
孫悟空の旅立ちSon Gokū no Tabidachi/Embarkation of Son Goku
龍球を求めてRyū-Dama wo Motomete/Seeking Out the Dragon Balls
エンカウントEnkaunto/Encounter
陽気な仲間達Yōki na Nakamatachi/Cheerful Friends
ブリッジ２：ミッションBurijji Tzū: Misshon/Bridge 2: Mission
偉大な師匠のもとで...Idai na Shishō no Motode.../Payment of a Great Teacher...
天下一武道会Tenkaichi Budōkai
恐怖の瞬間！！Kyōfu no Shunkan!!/Moment of Fear!!
決意！！Ketsui!!/Determination!!
ブリッジ１：ちょっとひといき‥Burijji Wan: Chotto Hitoiki../Bridge 1: A Little Breather..
大魔王復活！！Daimaō Fukkatsu!!/The Great Demon King Revived!!
突激！孫悟空Totsugeki! Son Gokū/A Violent Strike! Son Goku
エピローグ－ピッコロ大魔王の終焉－Epirōgu~Pikkoro Daimaō no Shūen~/Epilogue: Final Moments of Piccolo The Great Demon King

Ultimate Battle 22 

 is the licensed soundtrack of the video game of the same name that was exclusively for the PlayStation. It was released by Forte Music Entertainment on July 21, 1995.

This album features arranged versions of the game's music, composed by video game composer Kenji Yamamoto, as well as a vocal duet of the game's closing theme, Eien no Yakusoku, by Hironobu Kageyama and Kuko.

Track listing:
永遠の約束・オーバーチュアEien no Yakusoku Ōbāchua/Promise of Eternity: Overture
アルティメットバトル22・オープニング#1～#2Aruteimeito Batoru Towintetzū Ōpuningu #Wan~#Tzū/Ultimate Battle 22 Opening #1~#2
戦場を駆けるSenjô wo Kakeru/Running onto the Battlefield
Suite 5人の超戦士Suite Faivu no Chôsenshi/Suite: The 5 Super-Warriors
集う超戦士たちTsudô Chôsenshitachi/The Super-Warriors Gather
限界!!超サイヤ人3Genkai!! Sūpā Saiyajin Surī/The Limit!! Super Saiyan 3
ロイヤルガードRoiyaru Gādo/Royal Guard
絶体絶命!!Zettai Zetsumei!!/Absolute Death!!
最強の挑戦者!!Saikyô no Chôsensha!!/The Strongest Challenger!!
TRUNKS
戦いは続く･･･Tatakai Tsuzuku.../The Fighting Continues...
最凶を賭けて！Saikyô wo Kakete!/Wagering On The Worst Luck!
地球の救世主!? Chikyū no Kyūseishu!?/Savior of Earth!?
Suite 名場面シナリオSuite: Nabamen Shinario/Suite: Famous Scene Scenario
がんばれ！正義のヒーローGanbare! Seigi no Hīrō/Do Your Best! Hero of The Righteous
死神の降臨･･･Shinigami no Kôtan.../Birth of a God of Death
永遠の約束 デュエットバーションEien no Yakusoku Duetto Bājon/Eternal Promise Duet Version

Awakening Compilation 

 is a compilation soundtrack album of various video games. It was released Columbia Records on December 21, 1995.

The album features music from both Super Gokuden 2 and Ultimate Battle 22 composed and performed by Kenji Yamamoto. Also included, are the vocal versions of "Hikari no Willpower" and "Namidami Taina Ame ga Furu", plus vocal and karaoke version of "Eien no Yakusoku" by Hironobu Kageyama and Kuko.

Track listing:
覚醒編・オープニングテーマKakuseihen Ōpuningu Tēma/Awakening Edition Opening Theme
光のWILL POWERHikari no WILL POWER/Willpower of Light
Suite 「強襲！！」Suite Kyôshū!!/Suite "Violent Assault!!"
Bridge「果てしない冒険」Bridge [Hateshinai Bôken]/Bridge "Everlasting Adventure"
絶体絶命Zettaizetsumei/A Desperate Situation
戦場を駆けるSenjô o Kakeru/Running Battlefields
死神の降誕Shinigami no Kôtan/The God of Death's Royal Birth
Bridge「神秘の世界」Bridge [Shinpi no Sekai]/Bridge "World of Mystery"
Suite「陽気な仲間たち２」Suite "Yôki na Nakamatachi 2"/Suite: Cheerful Friends 2
界王星Kaiôsei/Kaiô Student
哀歌（エレジー）Aika (Erejī)/Sad Song (Elegy)
Z戦士のテーマZetto Senshi no Tēma/ Theme of The Z Warriors
Bridge「ちょっとひといき・・・２」Bridge [Chottohitoiki...Tzū]/Bridge "A Short Break...2"
Suite「闘いの挽歌」Suite "Tatakai no Banka"/Suite: The Battle's Fight Song
孫悟空･･･復活!!Son Gokū... Fukkatsu!!/Son Goku... Revival!!
Suite「レクイエム」Suite [Rekuiemu]/Suite "Requiem"
ナメック星崩壊!!（ゲーム未収録曲）Namekkusei Hôkai!! (Gēmu Mishūrokukyoku)/Planet Namek Collapsing!! (Unrecorded Game Song)
エンディングテーマ「涙みたいな雨が降る」Endeingu Tēma "Namidami Taina Ame ga Furu" [Bōnesu Torakku]/Ending Theme: Tears Falling As It Rain "Bonus Track"
「永遠の約束」カラオケ指導 "Eien no Yakusoku" Karaoke Shidô/Promise of Eternity: Karaoke Guidance
「永遠の約束」オリジナル・カラオケ"Eien no Yakusoku" Orijinaru Karaoke/"Promise of Eternity" Original Karaoke

Rebirth Compilation 

 is a licensed video game soundtrack from various games, and is also the follow-up to the album Dragon Ball Z: Game Music Awakening Compilation. It was released by Columbia Records on April 20, 1996.

This release includes music from Shin Butoden and Hyper Dimension to name a few. The album cover has miss lead many people to believing that the album is exclusive to the music of Hyper Dimension.

Track listing:
真武闘伝のテーマShin Butōden no Tēma/Theme of True Fighting Story
闘いの挽歌Tatakai no Banka/Elegy of Battle
決戦！Kessen!/Decisive Battle!
ベジータのテーマBejīta no Tēma/Theme of VegetaTHEME OF HYPER DIMENSION
BATTLE EDITION
DANGER SIGNAL
DEAR
ザーボンのテーマZābon no Tēma/Theme of ZarbonMr.サタンモードMr.Satan Mōdo/Mr. Satan Mode怒れ，悟飯！！Okore, Gohan!!/Get Angry, Gohan!!凶戦士ベジータKyō Senshi Bejīta/Evil Warrior Vegeta宿命の対決Shukumei no Taiketsu/Confrontation of Destinyエンディングテーマ「灼熱のファイティング」Endingu Tēma [Shakunetsu no FIGHTING]/Ending Theme [Incandescence of Fighting]まひるの闇～Prince Of Darkness～Mahiru no Yami~Prince Of Darkness~/Darkness of Midday~Prince Of Darkness~ 光のWILL POWER（オリジナル・カラオケ）（ボーナストラック）Hikari no WILL POWER (orijinaru karaoke) (Bōnasu Torakku)/Willpower of Light [Original Karaoke] (Bonus Track)Track Credits:
1-13.Kenji Yamamoto
14.Hironobu Kageyama
15.Shin'ichi Ishihara

 Idainaru Dragon Ball Densetsu 

 is the official licensed soundtrack of the video game of the same name. It was released by Columbia Records on August 21, 1996 and again on Columbia's R-Ban series on October 21, 2001.

The game has the distinction of being the only one in the series with an original score during the 32 bit era. The music was composed and arranged by Kenji Yamamoto and includes three vocal version tracks by Hironobu Kageyama and Shin'ichi Ishihara. The red book from Saturn version of the game includes music that can be accessed when played in an ordinary CD player, but some of these tracks are opening narratives by the series narrator Joji Yanami.

Track listing:
 "Prologue"
 "Sign~兆~" (Vocal Version)SIGN~Kizashi~ (Vocal Version) /Sign: Omen (Vocal Version) "Theme of Assault" (Medley Version)
 "Crisis" (Powerful Arrange Version)
 "Fear" (Medley Version)
 "Theme of Mortification" (Medley Version)
 "Fire of Black~黒い炎~" (Vocal Version)FIRE OF BLACK~Kuroi Honō~ (Vocal Version)/Fire of Black: Black Flame (Vocal Version) "Restoration" (Medley Version)
 "Exhilarating" (Powerful Arrange Version)
 "エンディング・テーマ Never Ending, Never Give Up" (Vocal Version)Endingu Teimu: Never Ending, Never Give Up (Vocal Version) /Ending Theme: "Never Ending, Never Give Up" (Vocal Version)''

Track Credits:
 Music composed by Kenji Yamamoto
 2 & 10 Hironobu Kageyama
 7 Shin'ichi Ishihara

References 

Game Music Series
Video game soundtracks
1993 soundtrack albums
1994 soundtrack albums
1995 soundtrack albums
1996 soundtrack albums
2001 soundtrack albums